Evgeniia Levanova (born ) is a Russian group rhythmic gymnast. She is a three-time (2017–2019) World Group all-around champion.

Career
Evgeniia took up rhythmic gymnastics at the age of 4 in her home town Cheboksary, Russia. Her mother introduced her to this sport. She joined Russian National team in 2016.

In September 2019, Shishmakova and the Russian group won the Group All-Around title at the 2019 Rhythmic Gymnastics World Championships. They won bronze medal in 5 Balls final and another gold in 3 Hoops + 4 Clubs final the next day.

References

External links
 

2000 births
Living people
Russian rhythmic gymnasts
Medalists at the Rhythmic Gymnastics World Championships
People from Cheboksary
Sportspeople from Chuvashia
21st-century Russian women